In mathematics, the Fox–Wright function (also known as Fox–Wright Psi function, not to be confused with Wright Omega function) is a generalisation of the generalised hypergeometric function pFq(z) based on ideas of  and :

Upon changing the normalisation

it becomes pFq(z) for A1...p = B1...q = 1.

The Fox–Wright function is a special case of the Fox H-function :

Wright function 

The entire function  is often called the Wright function. Its series representation is

This function is used extensively in fractional calculus and the stable count distribution.

Three properties were stated in Theorem 1 of Wright (1933) and 18.1(30-32) of Erdelyi, Bateman Project, Vol 3 (1955) (p.212)

Equation (a) is a recurrence formula. (b) and (c) provide two paths to reduce a derivative. And (c) can be derived from (a) and (b).

M-Wright function 

 is known as the M-Wright function, entering as a probability density in a relevant class of self-similar stochastic processes, generally referred to as time-fractional diffusion processes.

Its properties were surveyed in Mainardi et al (2010). 
Through the stable count distribution,  is connected to Lévy's stability index .

where

See also 

 Hypergeometric function
 Generalized hypergeometric function

References

External links
 hypergeom on GitLab

Factorial and binomial topics
Hypergeometric functions
Series expansions